Something Old / Something New is the third extended play recorded by Canadian rock group Marianas Trench, released May 26, 2015 through 604 Records, Cherrytree Records, and Interscope Records. It contains two songs originally recorded for the band's fourth studio album, Astoria (2015), and two tracks that pre-date the recording of their debut studio album, Fix Me (2006), from their Self-Titled EP "Marianas Trench" (2002). The EP was released in promotion of Astoria and serves as a "thank you" to their fans.

Background
After wrapping up promotion of their previous studio album, Ever After (2011), in 2013, the group returned to the studio to work on new music. The release of "Pop 101" in July 2014 was intended as the beginning of the Astoria era and was followed up with a second single ("Here's to the Zeros") that winter. However, when the band officially announced Astoria, they ultimately decided not to include either of these tracks, as they no longer fit the tone of the record. These singles were repackaged with two old tracks from before Fix Me (2006) and released as the Something Old / Something New EP to tide fans over until the release of the album (Astoria).

Singles
"Pop 101" was released July 29, 2014 as the lead single for the EP, and the originally-announced lead single for the then-upcoming album, Astoria. Its music video premiered on MuchMusic on August 1, 2015 before being uploaded to their Vevo account on August 4. The song reached a peak position of 27 on the Canadian Hot 100 and was certified Gold by Music Canada in November 2014.

The second single, "Here's to the Zeros", was released December 25, 2014. It reached number 57 on the Canadian Hot 100.

Track listing

Chart performance

Singles

References

2015 EPs
Marianas Trench (band) EPs
604 Records albums
Cherrytree Records albums
Interscope Records EPs